Michael Lawrence Magpayo (born November 9, 1979) is an American men's college basketball head coach for the UC Riverside Highlanders. In July 2020, Magpayo became the first NCAA Division I men's basketball head coach of full Asian heritage.

Early life 
Magpayo is a native of Hacienda Heights, California. He attended UC Santa Barbara, graduating with a degree in business economics in 2001. He was a high school basketball coach from 2001 to 2010. Magpayo also served as the CEO of a multi-million dollar real estate company in Southern California.

Coaching career 
Magpayo served as an assistant at Columbia from 2010 to 2014. He was an assistant at Campbell from 2014 to 2017. During the 2016-17 season, Campbell reached the ASUN Conference championship game as well as the CIT quarterfinals in the school's first postseason appearance since 1992. Magpayo served as the director of operations at San Francisco during the 2017-18 season, helping the team to a 22-7 record.

Magpayo joined the staff of David Patrick at UC Riverside in 2018. He helped the team improve from nine wins in his first season to 17 wins in the 2019-20 season. In June 2020, he was promoted to associate head coach. Magpayo was named head coach on July 1, after Patrick left to become an assistant at Arkansas. Magpayo became the first NCAA Division I head coach of full Asian heritage.

After leading the Highlanders to a 14-8 record in his first season, on May 21, 2021, Magpayo signed a five year extension with UC Riverside.

Head coaching record

Personal life 
Magpayo's parents Lito and Nenet were born and raised in the Philippines. His wife, Caroline, attended UC Riverside.

References

External links 
UC Riverside profile
San Francisco profile
Columbia profile

1979 births
Living people
American men's basketball coaches
Basketball coaches from California
Campbell Fighting Camels basketball coaches
College men's basketball head coaches in the United States
Columbia Lions men's basketball coaches
People from Hacienda Heights, California
San Francisco Dons men's basketball coaches
UC Riverside Highlanders men's basketball coaches
University of California, Santa Barbara alumni
American sportspeople of Filipino descent